Marion Harrison (born ) is a Welsh wheelchair curler.

Teams

References

External links 

1946 births
Living people
Welsh female curlers
Welsh wheelchair curlers
Place of birth missing (living people)